Show Low Lake is a  lake nestled at  elevation in the White Mountains of Arizona which is administered by the Arizona Game and Fish Department along with the city of Show Low. Show Low Lake Park is located five miles (8 km) south of Show Low.

Description

The lake maintains good water quality year round, and is stocked with rainbow trout from April through September. The Arizona Game and Fish Department occasionally stocks channel catfish. The lake also contains reproducing populations of walleye, largemouth and smallmouth bass, bluegill and green sunfish.

Fish species
 Rainbow
 Largemouth Bass
 Smallmouth Bass
 Sunfish
 Catfish (Channel)
 walleye

External links
 White Mountains Online Website
 Arizona Boating Locations Facilities Map
 Arizona Fishing Locations Map
 Video of Show Low Lake

References

 

Lakes of Arizona
Lakes of Navajo County, Arizona